"Heartbeat" is a rockabilly song originally recorded by Bob Montgomery and credited to Norman Petty. It was recorded most famously by Buddy Holly in 1958. The B-side of the single was "Well... All Right" (Buddy Holly, Norman Petty, Jerry Allison, Joe Mauldin). "Heartbeat" reached the UK top 10 twice. Firstly in 1975 for Showaddywaddy at number 7 and again in 1992 for Nick Berry, recorded as the theme to the television series Heartbeat and reached number 2.

Hit versions
"Heartbeat" was the second to last of Holly's singles to be released during his lifetime. It was a minor hit in the United States, reaching number 82 on the Billboard Hot 100 chart.

Holly's single had more chart impact in the UK, reaching number 30 in January 1959 and again upon its reissue in April 1960. In the interim between the two UK chartings of the Holly original, a remake by the Dale Sisters (catalogue number HMV POP 710) reached number 33 in the UK.

"Heartbeat" subsequently reached the UK top 10 twice. Firstly in 1975 for Showaddywaddy, number 7 that September, and again in 1992 when Nick Berry's version, recorded as the theme to the television series Heartbeat, in which he starred, reached number 2 that June. Tommy Allsup played the lead guitar part on the recording.

Charts

Buddy Holly version

Showaddywaddy version

Nick Berry version

Weekly charts

Year-end charts

Cover versions of "Heartbeat"
Versions of "Heartbeat" have appeared on albums by:
 Tommy Roe (Sheila, 1962)
 Bobby Vee (I Remember Buddy Holly, 1963)
 Herman's Hermits — who had originally been named the Heartbeats after the Buddy Holly song (Herman's Hermits on Tour, 1965)
 Dave Berry (One Dozen Berries, 1966)
 Skeeter Davis (Skeeter Sings Buddy Holly, 1967)
 Cliff Richard (Don't Stop Me Now, 1967; also a non-charting US single release)
 Humble Pie (Town and Country, 1969)
 Cilla Black (It Makes Me Feel So Good, 1976)
 Denny Laine, guitarist of Wings and Moody Blues fame, covered the song on his 1977 Buddy Holly tribute album, Holly Days, produced by Paul McCartney.
 The Knack (Get the Knack, 1979)
 The Hollies, who had named themselves after Buddy Holly, made their only attempt at having a hit remake of a Buddy Holly song with a 1980 single release of "Heartbeat", a midtempo version that charted at #82 on the Billboard Hot 100.
 A Dutch rendering of "Heartbeat" was recorded in 1982 by Ciska Peters (nl).
 "Heartbeat" served as the title cut for a 1993 album release by Hank Marvin. (Cliff Richard provided the background vocal on the instrumental track). Marvin's album reached no. 17 in the UK.
 Connie Francis (With Love to Buddy, 1996)
 Mike Berry (Buddy — a Life in Music, 1999)
 Speedy Sparks (OK, Let's Play, 2001)
 P. J. Proby (Sentimental Journey, 2003)
 On the 2004 album, The Crickets and Their Buddies, which featured various vocalists fronting Buddy Holly's band the Crickets, Nanci Griffith provided the vocal on a remake of "Heartbeat".
 Black Tambourine (Black Tambourine, 2010)
 Kay Das ("Shadows on Steel", 2008)

Cover versions of "Well... All Right"
The B-side of the single, "Well... All Right", was covered by:
 Blind Faith on their self-titled debut album.
 Santana on the Inner Secrets album in 1978. This version peaked at #69 on the US Hot 100.
 Alain Bashung on his album Osez Joséphine in 1991.
 Nancy Griffith (with the remaining members of The Crickets) on the Not Fade Away (Remembering Buddy Holly) tribute album in 1996.
 Albert Hammond, Jr. on his album Yours to Keep in 2006.
 Kid Rock on the Rave On Buddy Holly tribute album in 2011.
 Lyle Lovett on the Listen to Me: Buddy Holly tribute album in 2011.
 The Smithereens recorded in 2008, released on their album Covers in 2018.
 Pen Ran recorded her own version of the song during the early 1970's. The title is "Enjurng Lerng Rom" but in English that says "Come to Dance".

See also
 "Poor Me"
 Buddy Holly discography

References

1958 songs
1958 singles
1975 singles
1992 singles
Buddy Holly songs
Showaddywaddy songs
Nick Berry songs
Coral Records singles
Songs written by Bob Montgomery (songwriter)
Songs written by Norman Petty